Tinorangsak or tinoransak is an Indonesian hot and spicy meat dish that uses specific bumbu (spice mixture) found in Manado cuisine of North Sulawesi, Indonesia. The most common meat used in tinorangsak is pork. However, other kind of meat such as beef, chicken or seafood might be used as well. Spices mixture includes chili pepper, shallot or onion, ginger, lime leaves, lemongrass, lime juice, cooking oil, and salt.

Tinorangsak is a prerequisite dish commonly served in Minahasan traditional ceremonies. Traditionally tinorangsak is cooked in a bamboo tube. Diced pork and rich spices are inserted into bamboo tube and burned on an open fire. Usually tinorangsak are served with nasi jaha, a glutinous rice dish cooked in bamboo tube in similar fashion to lemang.

See also

Rica-rica
Dabu-dabu
Woku
Paniki
Tinutuan

References

External links
Tinoransak recipes

 
Indonesian cuisine